Herman Arthur "Harry" Lauter (June 19, 1914  – October 30, 1990) was an American character actor.

Early years
Lauter was born in White Plains, New York. He worked as a model for a professional photographer and was a rodeo rider before moving into acting.

Lauter came from an entertainment-oriented family, with his father and grandfather having been part of The Flying Lauters trapeze act.

Career

Lauter's acting break came with a role in The Magnificent Rogue (1946), in which he played a model.

He came to be a familiar presence in supporting roles in low-budget films, serials (where he was often cast because of his facial resemblance to stuntman Tom Steele, who would double for him), and television programs in the 1950s.  Only once did he really come close to stardom, as Clay Morgan, one of the leads in the CBS television series Tales of the Texas Rangers, which aired fifty-two episodes from 1955 to 1958. His co-star was Willard Parker as Ranger Jace Pearson.

Lauter portrayed Ralph Cotton on the television version of The Roy Rogers Show. He made appearances on many television programs, particularly westerns: The Gene Autry Show (sixteen episodes), Annie Oakley (twelve episodes), The Lone Ranger and The Range Rider (eleven episodes each), Gunsmoke and Rawhide (ten episodes each), Death Valley Days and The Adventures of Ozzie and Harriet (seven episodes each), Laramie and Dick Powell's Zane Grey Theater (six episodes each), The Virginian and State Trooper (five times each), and Cheyenne, Bonanza, and Maverick (three episodes each).

In a departure from his appearance in westerns, he played the character of Atlasand, chief officer to Cleolanta  the evil Suzerain of Ophesius, in several episodes of Rocky Jones Space Ranger in 1953.

Lauter appeared twice as Johnny Tyler in 1959–1960 in two episodes of the ABC/Warner Brothers western series Colt .45, starring Wayde Preston.

Lauter was cast twice on the NBC children's western series Fury, with Peter Graves and Bobby Diamond, and on Tombstone Territory, starring Pat Conway. Lauter also appeared on NBC's Jefferson Drum, National Velvet, and Riverboat, on CBS's Have Gun - Will Travel, with Richard Boone, and the syndicated western-themed crime drama U.S. Marshal.  In 1958 he appeared in the episode "Rodeo", along with Lee Van Cleef, Barbara Baxley, and Dan Blocker, on the CBS crime drama Richard Diamond, Private Detective, starring David Janssen.  Later he guest-starred in the 1962-1963 ABC drama series Going My Way with Gene Kelly.  He also made a guest appearance in 1963 on CBS's Perry Mason in "The Case of the Potted Planter."

His last screen appearance was in 1979 as Marshal Charlie Benton in James Arness's ABC series How the West Was Won.

Most of his career was spent as a serviceable second lead or heavy, though he continued to play bit parts in larger pictures, including an uncredited part as a plain-clothes policeman in the 1949 crime drama White Heat, which starred James Cagney and Edmond O'Brien. He also had an uncredited, non-speaking role in the 1963 Stanley Kramer comedy It's a Mad, Mad, Mad, Mad World as a police dispatcher.

The son of an artist, Lauter devoted much of his energy late in his life to his own painting and the operation of an art gallery.

Personal life
Lauter was married to Barbara Ayres.

Death
Lauter died of a heart attack on October 30, 1990, in Ojai in Ventura County, California, at age 76. His ashes were scattered into the Pacific Ocean.

Selected filmography

 The Big Broadcast of 1938 (1938) as Sailor (uncredited)
 The Magnificent Rogue (1946) as Boy Model (uncredited)
 Hit Parade of 1947 (1947) as Handsome Boy (uncredited)
 Let's Live Again (1948) as Bit (uncredited)
 A Foreign Affair (1948) as Corporal (uncredited)
 The Gay Intruders (1948) as Male Secretary
 Moonrise (1948) as Man Dancing with Gilly (uncredited)
 Incident (1948) as Bill Manning
 Parole, Inc. (1948) as Donald Perkins (uncredited)
 Jungle Patrol (1948) as Lt. Derby
 Life of St. Paul Series (1949) as Man in Antioch
 State Department: File 649 (1949) as Foreign Service Trainee (uncredited)
 Prince of the Plains (1949) as Tom Owens
 Tucson (1949) as George Reeves Jr.
 Frontier Investigator (1949) as Rocky's Brother
 Alimony (1949) as Doctor
 The Great Dan Patch (1949) as Bud Ransome
 I Was a Male War Bride (1949) as Naval Lt. Perkins (uncredited)
 Slattery's Hurricane (1949) as Control Tower Operator (uncredited)
 Bandit King of Texas (1949) as Trem Turner
 Zamba (1949) as Jim
 White Heat (1949) as Man with Microphone in Back Seat of Car (uncredited)
 Without Honor (1949) as Ambulance Attendant
 Twelve O'Clock High (1949) as Radio Officer (uncredited)
 Blue Grass of Kentucky (1950) as Dick Wentworth
 When Willie Comes Marching Home (1950) as Aide (uncredited)
 711 Ocean Drive (1950) as Flirty Man at Bar (uncredited)
 The Great Jewel Robber (1950) as Reporter (uncredited)
 The Showdown (1950) as Cowhand (uncredited)
 No Way Out (1950) as Orderly (uncredited)
 Bunco Squad (1950) as James Worth (uncredited)
 Between Midnight and Dawn (1950) as Detective (uncredited)
 I'll Get By (1950) as Assistant Director (uncredited)
 Flying Disc Man from Mars (1950, Serial) as Henchman Drake
 Experiment Alcatraz (1950) as Richard 'Dick' McKenna
 Counterspy Meets Scotland Yard (1950) as Agent Don Martin (uncredited)
 The Flying Missile (1950) as Army Base Information Desk Clerk (uncredited)
 The Day the Earth Stood Still as Lt. Platoon Leader (uncredited)
 Bowery Battalion (1951) as Lt. Branson (uncredited)
 Operation Pacific (1951) as Freddie - Officer on Submarine Corvena (uncredited)
 Call Me Mister (1951) as  Soldier (uncredited)
 Silver City Bonanza (1951) as Pete Horne
 Inside Straight (1951) as Hal - Ada's Business Assistant (uncredited)
 Thunder in God's Country (1951) as Marshal Tim Gallery
 Whirlwind (1951) as Wade Trimble
 According to Mrs. Hoyle (1951) as Gordon Warren
 Lorna Doone (1951) as Calvin Oates Jr. (uncredited)
 Let's Go Navy! (1951) as Dalton V. Dalton (uncredited)
 Flying Leathernecks (1951) as Freddie (uncredited)
 The Mob (1951) as Daniels - Mobile Unit #2 Detective (uncredited)
 Roadblock (1951) as Saunders (uncredited)
 The Hills of Utah (1951) as Henchman Evan Fox
 Come Fill the Cup (1951) as Cameron - Ives' Pilot (uncredited)
 The Racket (1951) as Officer Mosley (uncredited)
 The Kid from Amarillo (1951) as Tom Mallory
 Valley of Fire (1951) as Tod Rawlings
 I Want You (1951) as Art Stacey (uncredited)
 The Steel Fist (1952) as Franz
 This Woman Is Dangerous (1952) as Trooper (uncredited)
 Rancho Notorious (1952) as Deputy at Gunsight (uncredited)
 Bugles in the Afternoon (1952) as Cpl. Jackson (uncredited)
 Night Train to Galveston (1952) as Evans (uncredited)
 Talk About a Stranger (1952) as Clarence the Bookkeeper (uncredited)
 Sound Off (1952) as Laughing Corporal (uncredited)
 Red Ball Express (1952) as Lt. Michaelson, Sentry (uncredited)
 Apache Country (1952) as Dave Kilrain
 The Winning Team (1952) as Eddie Collins (scenes deleted)
 Sea Tiger (1952) as Randall, alias Jon Edmun
 Yukon Gold (1952) as Ace Morgan
 Battle Zone (1952) as Marine Intelligence Officer (uncredited)
 Androcles and the Lion (1952) as Officer (uncredited)
 Prince of Pirates (1953) as Jan
 I Love Melvin (1953) as Look Magazine Board of Directors (uncredited)
 Rocky Jones, Space Ranger (1953) as Atlasand
 The Marshal's Daughter (1953) as Russ Mason
 Pack Train (1953) as Roy (uncredited)
 Canadian Mounties vs. Atomic Invaders (1953, Serial) as Clark, a Mountie [Ch.12]
 Topeka (1953) as Mack Wilson
 The Fighting Lawman (1953) as Outlaw Al Clark - aka Al Deacons
 The Big Heat (1953) as Hank O'Connell (uncredited)
 Crime Wave (1953) as Roadblock Officer (uncredited)
 Flight Nurse (1953) as MATS Cargoman (uncredited)
 Fighter Attack (1953) as Lieutenant Duncan
 Forbidden (1953) as Holly (uncredited)
 Trader Tom of the China Seas (1954, Serial) as Tom Rogers
 Riot in Cell Block 11 (1954) as Prison Switchboard Operator (uncredited)
 The Boy from Oklahoma (1954) as Jim (uncredited)
 Dragonfly Squadron (1954) as Capt. Vedders
 Yankee Pasha (1954) as Dick Bailey
 They Rode West (1954) as Orderly (uncredited)
 The Forty-Niners (1954) as Gambler
 Captain Kidd and the Slave Girl (1954) as Mutineer (uncredited)
 Return to Treasure Island (1954) as Parker
 Dragnet (1954) as Officer Greeley (uncredited)
 The Bob Mathias Story (1954) as Irving Mondschein (uncredited)
 The Eternal Sea (1955) as Lt. Martin (pilot) (uncredited)
 Outlaw Treasure (1955) as Jesse James
 Lord of the Jungle (1955) as Pilot (uncredited)
 King of the Carnival (1955) as Bert King
 Not as a Stranger (1955) as Harry, Radio Broadcaster (uncredited)
 It Came from Beneath the Sea (1955) as Deputy Bill Nash
 Creature with the Atom Brain (1955) as Reporter #1
 Apache Ambush (1955) as Bailey (uncredited)
 The Crooked Web (1955) as Sgt. Mike Jancoweizc
 Dig That Uranium (1955) as Ron Haskell
 At Gunpoint (1955) as Federal Marshal
 Women Without Men (1956) as U.S. State Dept. Security Chief
 The Man in the Gray Flannel Suit (1956) as Army Corporal on Leave (uncredited)
 The Three Outlaws (1956) as Army Recruiting Sergeant (uncredited)
 The Werewolf (1956) as Deputy Ben Clovey
 Earth vs. the Flying Saucers (1956) as Cutting - Generator Technician (uncredited)
 Miami Exposé (1956) as Det. Tim Grogan
 Gun Brothers (1956) as Deputy (uncredited)
 Tension at Table Rock (1956) as Stagecoach Shotgun Rider (uncredited)
 The Women of Pitcairn Island (1956) as Ben Fish
 The Badge of Marshal Brennan (1957) as Doc Hale
 Hellcats of the Navy (1957) as Lt. (j.g.) Wes Barton
 Shootout at Medicine Bend (1957) as Briggs (uncredited)
 The Oklahoman (1957) as Grant (uncredited)
 The Lawless Eighties (1957) as Andy Bowers (uncredited)
 Death in Small Doses (1957) as Steve Hummel / Mr. Brown
 Jet Pilot (1957) as Sergeant (uncredited)
 Raiders of Old California (1957) as Lt. Scott Johnson
 Official Detective series Episode "Bombing Terror" (1958) as Richards
 Return to Warbonnet (1958) as Tom - Deputy Sheriff (uncredited)
 Toughest Gun in Tombstone (1958) as Joe Barger
 The Case Against Brooklyn (1958) as Rookie Cop (uncredited)
 Tarzan's Fight for Life (1958) as Dr. Ken Warwick
 The Cry Baby Killer (1958) as Police Lt. Porter
 Girl on the Run (1958) as Drunk
 The Last Hurrah (1958) as Votes Tallyman (uncredited)
 Good Day for a Hanging (1959) as Matt Fletcher (uncredited)
 The Louisiana Hussy (1959) as Clay Lanier
 The Gunfight at Dodge City (1959) as City Marshal Ed Masterson
 Date with Death (1959) as Lt. George Caddell
 Key Witness (1960) as Police Officer Hurley (uncredited)
 Posse from Hell (1961) as Russell
 Buffalo Gun (1961) as Vin
 Lonely Are the Brave (1962) as Deputy in Canyon (uncredited)
 The Wild Westerners (1962) as Jud Gotch
 Showdown (1963) as Bartender (uncredited)
 It's a Mad, Mad, Mad, Mad World (1963) as Police Dispatcher (uncredited)
 The Satan Bug (1965) sa Fake SDI Agent
 Fort Courageous (1965) as Joe
 Harlow (1965) as Bus Driver (uncredited)
 The Convict Stage (1965) as Ben Lattimore - Starring Role - 1st Billing
 Ambush Bay (1966) as Cpl. Alvin Ross
 Batman (1966) as Mr Merrick, Times Reporter (uncredited)
 For Pete's Sake (1966)
 Return of the Gunfighter (1967) as Frank Marlowe (uncredited)
 Fort Utah (1967) as Britches
 More Dead Than Alive (1969) as Doctor
 Paint Your Wagon (1969) as Peddler (uncredited)
 Zig Zag (1970) as Detective (uncredited)
 Barquero (1970) as Steele
 Escape from the Planet of the Apes (1971) as General Winthrop
 The Todd Killings (1971)
 Superbeast (1972) as Stewart Victor (final film role)

Selected television

References

External links

1914 births
1990 deaths
American male television actors
American male film actors
American artists
People from White Plains, New York
People from Ojai, California
Male actors from Los Angeles
20th-century American male actors
Western (genre) television actors